Harrison Central Junior/Senior High School is located in Cadiz, Ohio, United States.  It is the only high school in the Harrison Hills City School District. Their mascot is the Huskies and they compete in the Ohio High School Athletic Association as a member of the Buckeye 8 Athletic League as well as the Ohio Valley Athletic Conference.

The school was established in 1999 from the consolidation of Cadiz High School (Cardinals), Jewett-Scio High School (Vikings), and Freeport Lakeland High School (Raiders).

Campus
The Harrison Hills City School District opened its 216,000 square foot PK-12 facility in August 2019.  The new centralized campus includes an elementary wing, middle school wing, high school wing, two gymnasiums, a 760-seat performing arts center, an artificial turf softball stadium, and an eight-lane track and field complex. The school district still retains the recently updated Mazeroski Field (Baseball) and stadium, Wagner Field (football) and stadium, and John W. Stephenson Center at the former high school.

Following the 2018/2019 academic year, the School District closed and demolished several former buildings, including the former Cadiz H.S./Harrison Central H.S., Jewett-Scio H.S./Harrison Jr. H.S./Harrison North Elementary, and Hopedale Elementary buildings.  According to a recent article, the district plans to sell the former Westgate Elementary School in Cadiz to Harrison County.

Academics and Extracurricular Activities
Harrison Central offers a wide variety of academic and extracurricular activities.  The school offer the Advanced Placement Program through the College Board as well as dual enrollment programs with local colleges and universities.  Furthermore, they offer advanced courses in math, science, and the liberal arts as well as courses in art, theatre, music, agriculture, environmental science, technology, and the Industrial arts.  Students can also take foreign language courses in Spanish, French, and American Sign Language.

Clubs and Organizations:

 Ohio Model United Nations
 Academic Challenge
 Band
 Choir
 FFA
 National Honor Society
 Student Council
 International Thespian Society (Theatre)

Athletics
In athletics, Harrison Central is primarily a part of the Ohio Valley Athletic Conference in division AAAA. They are also a member of secondary conference, the Buckeye 8. Harrison Central's boys are OHSAA Class AAA, while its girls are OHSAA Class AA. Their athletic director is Ray Hibbs.

Offered sports include:
Football
Wrestling
Baseball
Volleyball
Cross Country
Golf
Basketball
Softball
Track & Field
Soccer
Bowling
OVAC 4A Championships:
Baseball - 2000, 2005, 2006, 2013
Bowling (Girls) - 2020
Boys Basketball - 2007
Girls Basketball - 2014, 2015
Boys Cross Country - 1999, 2016
Girls Cross Country - 2006
Softball - 2009, 2015
Golf - 2019
Wrestling - 2009 (Tournament Champions)

References

External links
District Website

1999 establishments in Ohio
Educational institutions established in 1999
High schools in Harrison County, Ohio
Public high schools in Ohio
Public middle schools in Ohio